The Violin Concerto in A minor, Op. 82, by Alexander Glazunov is one of his most popular compositions. Written in 1904, the concerto was dedicated to violinist Leopold Auer, who gave the first performance at a Russian Musical Society concert in St. Petersburg on 15 February 1905. The British premiere of the concerto followed just over a year later, under the direction of Sir Henry Wood and with Mischa Elman as soloist.

The violin concerto is quite representative of Glazunov's technically brilliant style. There are no pauses or numbered sections in the concerto; it is nevertheless often described as consisting of either three or four movements, which may be variously labeled. The slow second movement is seamlessly inserted by the composer into the middle of the first movement, which is an original and rare structural peculiarity of this composition.

The main cadenza at the end of the first movement was composed by Glazunov himself. It utilizes extensive double-stopping technique and is considered one of the most difficult parts of the concerto.

References 

6. CD BMG 74321-63470-2: Jascha Heifetz, Walter Hendl: RCA Victor Symphony Orch, 1963: I. Moderato – II. Andante sostenuto – III. Tempo I – IV. Allegro

External links 

Compositions by Alexander Glazunov
Glazunov
1904 compositions
Compositions in A minor